Sarkis Moussa (born 14 February 1929) is a Lebanese boxer. He competed in the men's light welterweight event at the 1952 Summer Olympics.

References

External links
 

1929 births
Possibly living people
Lebanese male boxers
Olympic boxers of Lebanon
Boxers at the 1952 Summer Olympics
Place of birth missing (living people)
Light-welterweight boxers